The Steel Lady (also known as Treasure of Kalifa) is a 1953 American action film directed by Ewald André Dupont starring Rod Cameron and Tab Hunter. In the film, four Americans are stranded in the deserts of North Africa. They discover a buried German tank dating to World War II, and they attempt to cross the desert with it. But they are attacked by Bedouins, who want to retrieve stolen jewels from the tank.

Plot
Four American oil company employees crash-land in the desert of North Africa. They have limited food and water, no radio, no way to repair the plane, and with no hope of rescue, face a slow death. Then one of the crew spots the antenna of a German tank from World War II sprouting from the sands. Digging down, they discover the "Steel Lady" of the title, complete with mummified crew, lost in the dunes ten years before, out of water, fuel, and supplies, rather like themselves.

After burying the German crew, they attempt to repair their radio with parts from the tank's radio; only marginally successful, they manage to tell the outside world that they are alive, but the transmitting tube burns out just as they are about to relate their latitude.

They come up with a wild idea: If they can dig out and clean up the tank, they can use the gasoline left in the plane to drive out of the desert. They need to sacrifice some of their precious water for the tank's radiator, but they eventually get it running and choose to drive to a French Foreign Legion outpost over a hundred miles away. Along the way, Barlow—one of the foursome—discovers a hidden storage bay in the floor of the tank which contains a cache of jewels. He does not tell the others, but replaces it for retrieval at the end of their trip.

Before reaching the Foreign Legion outpost, the Americans come across a Bedouin oasis. The Bedouin leaders recognize the tank; it is the very one whose German occupants had stolen valuable jewels during the war. They pretend to be gracious hosts, but plot a way to gain possession of the tank in order to recover the treasure: They offer the group horses and a cargo camel, along with ample food and water, in exchange for the tank, explaining that the animals will be better suited for the journey and that the animals will bring money once the group is rescued.  The four men agree to the exchange.

Before leaving the oasis, Barlow returns to the tank to retrieve the jewels for himself, telling his colleagues that he is jamming the tank's machine gun so that the French will not think that they left such a weapon for the Bedouins. However, he drops a loose jewel onto the floor of the tank. During the night, the Bedouin leaders search the tank and find the loose jewel, thus telling them that the Americans know about the treasure. They go to their visitors and demand the jewels. Monahan, the leader, denies any knowledge since he does not know about Barlow's greedy find. The Bedouins demand to search their visitors, but Barlow begins to fight and the Americans flee to the tank and drive away. Larsen is wounded but he gets aboard the tank.

The Americans, now desperately low on water, come across a wounded native in the desert; he claims to have been hurt when his camel fell upon him. But he is one of the Bedouins, who has merely faked an injury, and now leads the tank into a trap: When he and the three healthy Americans leave the tank, his comrades move toward the tank to secure it. But Larsen, wounded but still aboard the tank, fights them off with the machine gun. Monahan and the others hear the gunfire and return to the tank. Barlow is wounded by gunfire and Monahan carries him back to the tank. As they drive off, their radiator is punctured and water leaks out; they cannot escape. It now becomes a stand-off with the Americans holed up in the tank, fighting off periodic attacks from the Bedouins in the surrounding hills.

Larsen comes up with an idea to cannibalize the tank's radio-receiving tubes to craft a transmitting tube. They manage to get the radio to transmit and send out a mayday, though they are out of range from all receiving stations except for a possible search plane which might still be looking for them.  The call is heard and a company plane lands amid gunfire from the Bedouins to rescue the Americans. While Larsen and Evans run to the plane, Monahan tries to pull Barlow out of the tank. However, Barlow—realizing that he is too wounded to make it—pushes Monahan off and locks himself in the tank. He then uses the machine gun to cover for Monahan running to the plane. Barlow presumably dies in the tank as the Bedouins rush onto the vehicle to capture it. The other three—who retain the jewels—are flown to safety. During the flight they recall how Barlow, though greedy and a drunkard, ended up as a worthy fighter who helped save the others.

Cast
Rod Cameron as Mike Monahan
Tab Hunter as Billy Larsen
John Dehner as Syd Barlow
Richard Erdman as Jim Evans
John Abbott as Mustapha El Melek
Frank Puglia as Sheik Taras
Anthony Caruso as Zagora
Christopher Dark as Ibrahim
Dick Rich as Sanderson
 Charles Victor as	Sanderson's Radio Man
 Carmen D'Antonio as Dancing Girl
 Suzanne Ridgway as Bedouin Servant Girl

Production
Filming started in December 1952.

Release
The film was released on a double bill with Captain John Smith and Pocahontas.

See also
Assault on a Queen (1966)

References

External links

1953 films
Films about armoured warfare
Films about aviation accidents or incidents
Films set in North Africa
Films produced by Edward Small
Films scored by Emil Newman
United Artists films
Films scored by Arthur Lange
Films with screenplays by Aubrey Wisberg
1950s English-language films
American action adventure films
American World War II films
1950s American films
Films with screenplays by Richard Schayer
Films set in deserts